Bellani is a surname of Italian origin. It may refer to:

 Adrian Bellani (born Gerardo Celasco; 1982), Italian actor
 Annalisa Bellani (1915–2015), Italian female tennis player
 Hicham Bellani (born 1979), Moroccan runner

See also 
 Belli (disambiguation)
 Belloni

it:Bellani